Hyotheridium is a possible Eutherian from the Late Cretaceous (?late Santonian–early Campanian) Djadochta Formation of Mongolia. It also could be a Deltatheriid, although the fossil, a poorly preserved skull with the upper and lower jaws connected in a way that makes them hard to separate and to examine, makes it difficult to determine what it is.

References

Cretaceous mammals
Prehistoric mammal genera
Extinct mammals of Asia
Fossil taxa described in 1926